The Finder is a 2001 Australian film.

Plot
An ex-cop sets himself up as "a finder" and gets involved in a mysterious kidnapping.

Production
The film was an idea of producer-writer Phil Avalon's. It was shot in 2000 with privately raised finance.

Reception
The film was finished by December 2000. It was sold to Israel, China, Russia and the CIR and was screened at the American Film Market in February 2001. It had a one off screening at Avalon's own bar in Sydney before being released on DVD.

The critic for Screen Daily said that:
Unable to unlock the potential of their sun/surf/sleuth concept, Avalon and veteran director Frank Shields instead deliver a compendium of overfamiliar situations, characters and dialogue, with an occasional ill-judged sequence of 'comic relief'. A committed bunch of talented actors do their best to energise an otherwise limp affair whose true home may well prove to be off-peak cable television.

References

External links

The Finder at Screen Australia
The Film Finder at thefilmfinder

Australian television films
2001 television films
2001 films
Australian thriller films
2001 thriller films
2000s English-language films
Films directed by Frank Shields